or  is a lake in Narvik Municipality in Nordland county, Norway.

See also
List of lakes in Norway

References

Ballangen
Lakes of Nordland